Meqas-e Jadid (also Romanized as Meqās-e Jadīd; also known as Meqyās-e Jadīd) is a village in Yeylaq Rural District, in the Central District of Kaleybar County, East Azerbaijan Province, Iran. At the 2006 census, its population was 143, in 30 families. According to a more recent statistics the population is 135 people in 38 families, which indicates a significant increase in the number of households while population is declining.

References 

Populated places in Kaleybar County